Pilas can refer to:
 Las Pilas, volcano in Nicaragua
 Pilas Island in the Sulu Archipelago, Philippines
 Pilas, Iran, Zanjan Province, Iran
 Pilas, Seville, Andalucia, Spain